Painted Ponies is a lost 1927 American silent Western film directed by B. Reeves Eason and starring Hoot Gibson. It was produced and distributed by Universal Pictures.

Cast
 Hoot Gibson as Bucky Simms
 William R. Dunn as Pinto Pete (credited as William Dunn)
 Charles Sellon as Mr. Blenning
 Otto Hoffman as Jim
 Ethlyne Clair as Pony Blenning
 Slim Summerville as Beanpole
 Chief White Spear
 Black Hawk
 Chief John Big Tree
 Mary Lopez

References

External links
 
 

1927 films
Lost American films
Films directed by B. Reeves Eason
Universal Pictures films
1927 Western (genre) films
Lost Western (genre) films
1927 lost films
Silent American Western (genre) films
1920s American films